The Ruger No. 1 is a single-shot rifle with a Farquharson-style hammerless falling-block action, introduced and manufactured by Sturm, Ruger & Co. since 1967. An underlever lowers the breechblock to allow ammunition loading and also cocks the rifle.  Lenard Brownell, commenting on his work at Ruger, said of the No. 1: "There was never any question about the strength of the action. I remember, in testing it, how much trouble I had trying to tear it up.  In fact, I never did manage to blow one apart."

A shotgun-style tang safety works on the hammer and sear. Available with an Alexander Henry, beavertail, or Mannlicher style forearm in a multitude of calibers.

Available cartridges

Over the years, the No. 1 has been chambered in many different cartridges, including:

.204 Ruger 
.218 Bee
.22 Hornet
.22 PPC
.22-250 Remington
.220 Swift
.222 Remington
.223 Remington
6mm PPC
6mm Remington
.243 Winchester
.25-06 Remington
.250 Savage
.257 Roberts
.257 Weatherby Magnum
6.5mm Remington
6.5×55mm
6.5-284 Norma
6.5 Creedmoor
.264 Winchester Magnum
.270 Winchester
.270 Weatherby Magnum
.275 Rigby/7×57mm
7mm-08
7mm Remington Magnum
7mm STW
.280 Remington
.280 AI
7.62x39mm
.30-30 Winchester
.30-40 Krag
.30-06 Springfield
.300 Winchester Magnum
.300 H&H Magnum
.300 Weatherby Magnum
.303 British
.308 Winchester
.338 Winchester Magnum
.35 Whelen
.357 Magnum
9.3×62mm
9.3×74mmR
.375 H&H Magnum
.375 Ruger
.38-55 Winchester
.404 Jeffery
.405 Winchester
.416 Remington Magnum
.416 Ruger
.416 Rigby
.44 Remington Magnum
.45-70 Government
.450 Bushmaster
.450 Marlin
.450 Nitro Express
.450/400 Nitro Express
.454 Casull
.458 Winchester Magnum
.458 Lott
.460 G&A (Guns & Ammo)
.460 S&W Magnum
.475 Linebaugh
.480 Ruger

See also
List of firearms
Table of handgun and rifle cartridges

References

External links
Ruger No. 1 (ruger-firearms.com)
Review of the Ruger No. 1 Rifle

No. 1
Falling-block rifles